Eduardo "Edu" Oncins (born 10 December 1964) is a Brazilian former professional tennis player.

Biography
Oncins, who comes from São Paulo, represented Brazil in a Davis Cup  tie against Ecuador in 1982.

During his career he twice qualified for the singles main draw of a grand slam tournament, at the 1983 Australian Open and 1984 French Open.

His younger brother, Jaime Oncins, played on the professional tour in the 1990s.

See also
List of Brazil Davis Cup team representatives

References

External links
 
 
 

1964 births
Living people
Brazilian male tennis players
Tennis players from São Paulo
21st-century Brazilian people
20th-century Brazilian people